Jeremy Spencer is an album by British blues rock musician Jeremy Spencer, who was a member of Fleetwood Mac from 1967–71. Released on 23 January 1970, this was his first solo album and the first solo album by a current member of Fleetwood Mac.

The album consisted of a collection of blues and 1950s songs, many of them parodies of other artists or styles. Spencer had already proved his powers of mimicry on the first two Fleetwood Mac albums, and he used this solo project to extend this to other forms of music, such as surf pop on "Surfin' Girl".  Other artists that came in for the Spencer treatment were Buddy Holly and Elvis Presley.

Accompanying Spencer on the album were the other members of Fleetwood Mac, although Peter Green was only present on one track, "String-a-long". This album can be seen as making up for Spencer's absence on the previous Fleetwood Mac album Then Play On.

On 17 October 1970, "Linda" was released as a single, with the non-album "Teenage Darling" on the B-side, composed by Spencer. During 1970 Fleetwood Mac concerts, Jeremy appeared on stage dressed as Elvis Presley, performing "Teenage Darling", with Peter Green on lead guitar.

In 2015, the album was released on CD, with "Teenage Darling" as a bonus track.

Track listing
All songs written by Jeremy Spencer, except where noted.

"Linda" - 2:19
"The Shape I'm In" (Lee Cathy, Otis Blackwell) - 4:10
"Mean Blues" - 2:20
"String-a-long" (Jimmy Duncan, Robert Doyle) - 2:46
"Here Comes Charlie (With His Dancing Shoes On)" - 2:58
"Teenage Love Affair" - 2:00
"Jenny Lee" - 2:00
"Don't Go Please Stay" - 2:38
"You Made a Hit" (Walt Maynard) - 2:10
"Take a Look Around Mrs Brown" - 4:30
"Surfin' Girl" - 2:03
"If I Could Swim the Mountain" - 3:30

Personnel
Jeremy Spencer – vocals, electric guitar, slide guitar, piano
Mick Fleetwood – drums, congas, percussion
John McVie – bass guitar
Danny Kirwan – guitar, backing vocals
Peter Green – banjo on "String-a-Long"
Steve Gregory – saxophone
Technical
Terence Ibbott - photography

Production
Produced by Jeremy Spencer

References

Jeremy Spencer albums
1970 debut albums
Reprise Records albums
Albums produced by Jeremy Spencer